Suhum Secondary Technical School is a co-ed secondary technical school in Suhum in the Eastern Region of Ghana founded in 1963.

Notable alumni 
 Professor Kwasi Opoku Amankwa - Director General of the Ghana Education Service
 Professor Victor Gadzekpo - Ghanaian academic, former Vice-Chancellor of Data Link University College
 Professor Samuel Sraku Lartey - Vice-Chancellor of Presbyterian University College
 Patrick Darko Missah - Director General of the Ghana Prisons Service
 David Asante-Apeatu - Inspector General of Police Ghana Police Service
 Sylvanus Dodji jeoffrey (Captain  Planet of 4x4)- musician
 Richard Asante(Kalybos)-Actor

References 

Schools in Ghana
Education in the Eastern Region (Ghana)